Qeshlaqat-e Afshar Rural District is in Afshar District of Khodabandeh County, Zanjan province, Iran. At the National Census of 2006, its population was 4,067 in 854 households. There were 2,813 inhabitants in 726 households at the following census of 2011. At the most recent census of 2016, the population of the rural district was 1,823 in 500 households. The largest of its 41 villages was Tuturqan, with 189 people.

References 

Khodabandeh County

Rural Districts of Zanjan Province

Populated places in Zanjan Province

Populated places in Khodabandeh County